KTBW-TV, virtual channel 20 (UHF digital channel 21), is a Trinity Broadcasting Network (TBN) owned-and-operated television station serving Seattle, Washington, United States, that is licensed to Tacoma. The station's studios are located on South 341st Place in Federal Way, and its transmitter is located on Gold Mountain near Bremerton.

History

KTBW originally signed on the air with the call sign KQFB on March 30, 1984. As KQFB, the station was originally locally owned by Family Broadcasting based in University Place, Washington. Family Broadcasting originally was going to broadcast Christian programming from several sources. Before the station went on the air, a minority interest in KQFB was acquired by the Trinity Broadcasting Network. When TBN acquired Family Broadcasting in full, the call letters were changed to KTBW  on December 18, 1984.

Subchannels

References

External links 
TBN official website

TBW-TV
Trinity Broadcasting Network affiliates
Television channels and stations established in 1984
1984 establishments in Washington (state)